Trevor Gard (born 2 June 1957) is a former English first-class cricketer who made over 100 appearances for Somerset between 1976 and 1989.  A right-handed lower-order batsman and wicket-keeper, Gard also bowled two balls in a County Championship match against Sussex in 1983, conceding eight runs to grant Sussex a 10 wicket victory.

References

External links
 
 

1957 births
Living people
English cricketers
Somerset cricketers